= La tumultueuse vie d'un déflaté =

La tumultueuse vie d’un déflaté
- Directed by: Camille Plagnet
- Screenplay by: Camille Plagnet
- Produced by: Ardèche Images Production
- Cinematography: Michel K. Zongo
- Edited by: Florence Bresson
- Music by: Youen Cadiou Eric Dambrin Pierre Thévenin
- Release date: 2009
- Running time: 59 minutes
- Country: France

La tumultueuse vie d’un déflaté is a 2009 documentary film.

== Synopsis ==
The film portrays the turbulent life of the "Great Z", an engine driver on the Abidjan - Ouagadougou line for twenty years. He was laid off in 1995 by the National Railways of Burkina Faso following the privatization imposed by the World Bank. A seasoned reveler and a hedonist to the bone, he suddenly finds himself with no reason to live. He has lost everything and lives a gloomy life while waiting for his retirement pension. Tormented and employing a brutal and violent vocabulary, he emphatically describes his problems, his hatreds and his hopes.

== Festivals ==
The film was the closing film for the 2010 Festival International du Film des Droits de l’Homme in Paris.

=== Awards ===
- Corsica Doc Prize for Best Film, Festival international du film documentaire d'Ajaccio
- Festival Internacional de Documentales de Ajaccio 2009
- Festival Quintessence (Ouidah, Benín) 2010
